Allegany County is located in the northwestern part of the U.S. state of Maryland. As of the 2020 census, the population was 68,106. Its county seat is Cumberland. The name Allegany may come from a local Lenape word, welhik hane or oolikhanna, which means 'best flowing river of the hills' or 'beautiful stream'. A number of counties and a river in the Appalachian region of the U.S. are named Allegany, Allegheny, or Alleghany. Allegany County is part of the Cumberland, MD-WV Metropolitan Statistical Area. It is a part of the Western Maryland "panhandle".

History
The western part of Maryland (including the present Allegany County) was originally part of Prince George's County when Maryland was formed in 1696. This county included six current counties, and by repeated splitting, new ones were generated: Frederick from Prince George's in 1748; and Montgomery and Washington from Frederick in 1776.

Allegany County was formed in 1789 by the splitting of Washington County. At the time it was the westernmost county in Maryland, but a split in 1872 produced Garrett County, the current westernmost county.

Prior to 1789, the Virginia Commonwealth claimed the area of present-day Garrett and Allegany Counties, of Maryland. A 1771–1780 map of Virginias counties, shows Hampshire County, but the Virginia State boundary has Hampshire outside that boundary line. When conducting genealogical research, it is possible to find tax records for Hampshire County, Virginia included in Maryland records, and Maryland records in Hampshire County... Hampshire County was formed in 1758 by the Virginia Commonwealth and at its founding, included the present day counties of Garrett and Allegany Counties in Maryland, and Hardy, Grant, Mineral, and part of Morgan Counties in what is now West Virginia.

Geography

Allegany County lies primarily in the Ridge-and-Valley Country of the Appalachian Mountains.  It is bordered to the north by the Mason–Dixon line with Pennsylvania, to the south by the Potomac River and West Virginia, to the east by Sideling Hill Creek and Washington County, Maryland, and to the west by a land border with Garrett County, Maryland.  The western part of the county contains a portion of the steep Allegheny Front, which marks the transition to the higher-elevation Appalachian Plateau and Allegheny Mountain region.  The town of Frostburg is located west of the Front at an elevation of nearly 2,100 feet above sea level, while the county seat of Cumberland, only eight miles away, has an elevation of only 627 feet.

Mountains

 Breakneck Hill (1,872 ft)
 Collier Mountain (1,460 ft)
 Dans Mountain (2,898 ft)
 Evitts Mountain (1,959–2,260 ft.)
 Green Ridge Mountain
 Haystack Mountain (1,240+ ft.)
 Irons Mountain
 Martin Mountain (1,974 ft)
 Nicholas Mountain (1,760 ft)
 Piney Mountain
 Polish Mountain (1,783 ft)
 Ragged Mountain (1,740 ft)
 Town Hill (2,039 ft)
 Warrior Mountain (2,185 ft)
 Wills Mountain (1,960+ ft.)

Adjacent counties

 Somerset County, Pennsylvania (northwest)
 Bedford County, Pennsylvania (north)
 Fulton County, Pennsylvania (northeast)
 Washington County (east)
 Morgan County, West Virginia (southeast)
 Hampshire County, West Virginia (south)
 Mineral County, West Virginia (southwest)
 Garrett County (west)

National protected areas
 Chesapeake and Ohio Canal National Historical Park (part)

Demographics

2020 census

Note: the US Census treats Hispanic/Latino as an ethnic category. This table excludes Latinos from the racial categories and assigns them to a separate category. Hispanics/Latinos can be of any race.

2010 census
As of the 2010 United States Census, there were 75,087 people, 29,177 households, and 17,959 families residing in the county. The racial makeup of the county was 89.2% white, 8.0% black or African American, 0.8% Asian, 0.1% American Indian, 0.2% from other races, and 1.6% from two or more races. Those of Hispanic or Latino origin made up 1.4% of the population. In terms of ancestry, 31.8% were German, 14.6% were Irish, 11.9% were English, 11.8% were American, and 5.6% were Italian.

Of the 29,177 households, 26.0% had children under the age of 18 living with them, 46.0% were married couples living together, 11.0% had a female householder with no husband present, 38.4% were non-families, and 31.6% of all households were made up of individuals. The average household size was 2.30 and the average family size was 2.86. The median age was 40.9 years.

The median income for a household in the county was $37,747 and the median income for a family was $52,680. Males had a median income of $42,322 versus $29,594 for females. The per capita income for the county was $20,764. About 9.6% of families and 14.5% of the population were below the poverty line, including 18.3% of those under age 18 and 8.8% of those age 65 or over.

2000 census
As of the census of 2000, there were 74,930 people, 29,322 households, and 18,883 families residing in the county.  The population density was 176 people per square mile (68/km2).  There were 32,984 housing units at an average density of 78 per square mile (30/km2).  The racial makeup of the county was 93.02% White, 5.35% Black or African American, 0.15% Native American, 0.52% Asian, 0.03% Pacific Islander, 0.19% from other races, and 0.75% from two or more races.  0.76% of the population were Hispanic or Latino of any race. 29.0% were of German, 16.7% US or American, 12.8% Irish, 10.7% English and 5.3% Italian ancestry according to Census 2000.

There were 29,322 households, out of which 26.50% had children under the age of 18 living with them, 50.60% were married couples living together, 10.30% had a female householder with no husband present, and 35.60% were non-families. 30.10% of all households were made up of individuals, and 15.20% had someone living alone who was 65 years of age or older.  The average household size was 2.35 and the average family size was 2.90.

In the county, the population was spread out, with 20.60% under the age of 18, 11.20% from 18 to 24, 26.80% from 25 to 44, 23.50% from 45 to 64, and 17.90% who were 65 years of age or older.  The median age was 39 years. For every 100 females there were 99.20 males.  For every 100 females age 18 and over, there were 96.90 males.

The median income for a household in the county was $30,821, and the median income for a family was $39,886. Males had a median income of $31,316 versus $21,334 for females. The per capita income for the county was $16,780.  About 9.70% of families and 14.80% of the population were below the poverty line, including 17.70% of those under age 18 and 9.50% of those age 65 or over.

, Allegany County had a racial and ethnic population composition of 88.16% Non-Hispanic whites, 8.03% Blacks, 0.14% Native Americans, 0.76% Asians, 0.04% Pacific Islanders, 0.08% Non-Hispanics who reported some other race, 1.47% Non-Hispanics who reported two or more races and 1.44% Hispanics.

Economy
According to the county's comprehensive annual financial reports, the top employers by number of employees in the county are the following. ("NR" indicates the employer was not ranked among the top ten employers that year.)

Communities

Cities
 Cumberland
 Frostburg

Towns
 Barton
 Lonaconing
 Luke
 Midland
 Westernport

Census-designated places
Occupying a middle ground between incorporated and unincorporated areas are Special Tax Districts, quasi-municipal unincorporated areas created by legislation passed by the Maryland General Assembly. They lack home rule authority and must petition the General Assembly for changes affecting the authority of the district. There are eight Special Tax Districts in the county:

 Bel Air
 Bowling Green
 Cresaptown
 Ellerslie
 La Vale
 McCoole
 Mount Savage
 Potomac Park

Other census-designated places in the county include:

 Barrelville
 Bier
 Borden Shaft
 Bowmans Addition
 Carlos
 Clarysville
 Corriganville
 Danville
 Dawson
 Detmold
 Eckhart Mines
 Flintstone
 Franklin
 Gilmore
 Grahamtown
 Klondike
 Little Orleans
 Midlothian
 Moscow
 National
 Nikep
 Ocean
 Oldtown
 Pleasant Grove
 Rawlings
 Shaft
 Spring Gap
 Vale Summit
 Woodland
 Zihlman

Unincorporated communities

 Amcelle
 Dickens
 Evitts Creek
 George's Creek
 Loartown
 McKenzie
 Narrows Park
 Pinto
 Town Creek

Government and infrastructure

Current government
The Allegany County Government is governed by a 3-member board of County Commissioners.

Libraries
The library system was created in 1960, when libraries in Cumberland, Frostburg, LaVale, Pennsylvania Avenue School, and Westernport were merged to form a unified library system. The first of the libraries which would make up the library system was the Washington Street library, founded in 1924. The most recent addition to the library system was the Georges Creek library, which opened in March 2001. The Allegany County Library System currently has six branches: Frostburg Library, Georges Creek Library, LaVale Library, South Cumberland Library, Washington Street Library, and Westernport Library.

Infrastructure
The North Branch Correctional Institution, (opened 2003), and the earlier adjacent Western Correctional Institution are operated by the Division of Corrections of the Maryland Department of Public Safety and Correctional Services, (with its headquarters in Baltimore, Maryland) is located in an unincorporated area of Allegany County, just southwest of Cumberland. The prison housed male death row inmates, who were moved from the Maryland Correctional Adjustment Center, from June 2010 until death row was closed in 2014.

Politics
Allegany County was granted a home rule form of government in 1974. It is a strongly Republican county, the last Democrat to win a majority being Jimmy Carter in 1976. The only other Democrats to carry the county since 1880 have been Lyndon B. Johnson, Franklin D. Roosevelt (twice), and by very narrow margins Harry S. Truman in 1948 and Woodrow Wilson in 1912.

|}

Transportation

Allegany County has been, since colonial times, an important node on the nation's transportation network as a key transition point in the movement of goods and people to and from the ports of the Mid-Atlantic and the agricultural and industrial production centers of the Ohio Valley and Midwest. The Cumberland Narrows, a naturally-occurring watergap separating Wills and Haystack Mountains, serves as one of the few passages through what is otherwise one of the steepest rushes of the Ridge and Valley province. Because of this, Cumberland has been the site of both planned and completed transportation projects focused on connecting east and west.

On his fateful march from Alexandria to Fort Duquesne in modern-day Pittsburgh during the French and Indian War, British General Edward Braddock and his men, including then-Lieutenant Colonel and Braddock's aide-de-camp George Washington, carved a road, closely following the Native American Nemacolin's Path, from the British encampment at Fort Cumberland, through the Allegheny Mountains all the way to Fort Duquesne. This road, known in early America as Braddock's Road, became the guidelines for the earliest sections of the Cumberland Road, or what later became known as the National Road. Specifically, the section on Braddock's Road from Cumberland to Uniontown, Pennsylvania was followed nearly exactly in the early construction of the National Road. A monument to the start of the National Road now stands on Greene Street in Cumberland, very near the spot Braddock and his men began their expedition.

In modern times, Allegany County is an important regional crossroads. It is crossed from east to west by Interstate 68 and US Route 40, and from north to south by US Route 220, which from Cumberland to the Mason-Dixon Line is part of the Appalachian Development Highway System's Corridor O.

Major highways

  Interstate 68
  U.S. Route 40
  US 40 Alt.
  U.S. Route 40 Scenic
  U.S. Route 220
  Maryland Route 35
  Maryland Route 36
  Maryland Route 47
  Maryland Route 49
  Maryland Route 51
  Maryland Route 53
  Maryland Route 55
  Maryland Route 135
  Maryland Route 144
  Maryland Route 638
  Maryland Route 657
  Maryland Route 658
  Maryland Route 935
  Maryland Route 936
  Maryland Route 956

Rail
 Amtrak
 Western Maryland Scenic Railroad

Public transportation
 Allegany County Transit

Education
Public K-12 education in the county is handled by Allegany County Public Schools (ACPS). ACPS is governed by an elected, five member Board of Education, plus an appointed superintendent. ACPS manages three high schools (grades 9-12), three middle schools (grades 6-8), 13 elementary schools (grades K-5), and one K-8 school, plus the Center for Career and Technical Education in Cresaptown, and the Eckhart Alternative School in Eckhart Mines.

Allegany County is also home to three Christian parochial schools: Bishop Walsh School (Catholic) in Cumberland, Lighthouse Christian Academy (non-denominational) in Cumberland, and Calvary Christian Academy (non-denominational) in Cresaptown.

Allegany County is home to Frostburg State University, one of the eleven member universities of the University System of Maryland, and the only public, four-year university in Maryland west of the Baltimore-Washington Metropolitan Area. The university, founded in 1898 as the Frostburg State Normal School, FSU, as the university is known to students and alumni, now offers more than 40 undergraduate majors and has a yearly enrollment consistently over 5,000 students.

A junior college experience is available in Allegany County with the Allegany College of Maryland, located in Cumberland. Allegany College provides more than 50 associate degree programs and more than 20 certificate programs, and has more than 3,500 enrollees and more than 16,000 registrants in its Continuing Education programs. ACM also operates a satellite campus in Everett, Pennsylvania, about 30 miles north of Cumberland in Bedford County.

Natural resources
The primary mineral resources extracted for use in Allegany County are coal, iron, sandstone,
and limestone. Coal bearing formations are concentrated in the Georges Creek Basin in the
western part of the county.

Notable residents
 Thomas Cresap (c. 1702–c. 1790), frontiersman and militia leader, who founded Oldtown and widened Nemacolin's Trail, which led west from Cumberland.
 Michael Cresap (1742–1775), born in Allegany County, American Revolutionary War officer.
 Patrick Hamill (1817–1895), born in Allegany County, United States Congressman from Maryland.
 Lloyd Lowndes former Governor of Maryland.
 Lefty Grove (1900–1975), born and raised in Lonaconing; Hall of Fame baseball pitcher with the Philadelphia Athletics and Boston Red Sox.
 William H. Macy (1950–), American actor.
 Sam Perlozzo, former manager of the Baltimore Orioles (2005–2007).
 Leo Mazzone, former pitching coach of the Baltimore Orioles and the Atlanta Braves.
 Casper R. Taylor, Jr., former Speaker of the House in the Maryland House of Delegates.
 Eddie Deezen, (1957–), American Actor.
 Ty Johnson (American football), (1997–), Running Back - Detroit Lions.
 Drew Hankinson, AKA "Luke Gallows", (1983–) American Professional Wrestler

See also

 National Register of Historic Places listings in Allegany County, Maryland
Sandy Creek may not be mentioned here.  Here is a reference that it existed (the letter symbols at the end of the reference are defined in a table at the end of Keegan's book)
A Third Rutan Family Index p 177  By James J. Keegan
Maryland Listings:
Peter Rutan - (1776-1848_ p/John Rutan-Catherine Jones of Morris Co. NJ; m (1) Elizabeth McIlrath (1771-1845) (2) Mary Webb (1788-1855) in 1846; he was living  in Sandy Creek, Allegany Co. in 1880 and moved to Markleysburg, Fayette Co. PA in 1812; they later (lived) in Caroll Co. OH; GSNJ; LDS; MEACH

References

External links

 Allegany County government
 

 
Maryland counties
Maryland counties on the Potomac River
Populated places established in 1789
1789 establishments in Maryland
Counties of Appalachia